Lieutenant Mehdi Huseynzade (22 December 1918, in Novxanı, Azerbaijan – 2 November 1944, in Vitovlje, Slovenia) was an Azerbaijani guerrilla and scout during World War II. He was posthumously awarded the title of Hero of the Soviet Union on 11 April 1957.

Biography

Early years
Mehdi Huseynzade was born on 22 December 1918 in the village of Novxanı in the Baku province of Azerbaijan Democratic Republic. Huseynzade graduated from the Baku Art School, then studied at the Leningrad Institute of Foreign Languages. After returning to Baku in 1940, Huseynzade continued his education at the Azerbaijan State Pedagogical University

World War II
In August 1941, two months after Germany invaded the Soviet Union, Huseynzade was drafted into the Red Army. After graduating from the Tbilisi military infantry school in 1942, he was dispatched to the Soviet-German front line, where he commanded a mortar platoon during the Battle of Stalingrad.

In August 1942, near the town of Kalach-na-Donu, Huseynzade was seriously wounded and captured by the Germans. He spent the 1.5 years in the German POW camps in Northern Italy and Yugoslavia. In the early 1944, along with two other Azerbaijani POWs, Javad Hakimli and Asad Gurbanov, Huseynzade managed to escape and join the Yugoslav-Italian partisans guerilla corps. During the same year, he became a commander of the special reconnaissance diversionary unit of the 9th Corps' Staff of the People's Liberation Army of Yugoslavia, where he got his battlename Mikhailo.

Guerrilla Mikhailo

In the middle of January 1944, Mikhailo with the fighters has grasped topographic maps of the opponent. Next month Mehdi in the form of the German officer has made way into German barracks and, having enclosed a mine to fire extinguishers, had blown up the central premise.

On 2 April 1944, Huseynzade with another Azerbaijani guerrilla, Mirdamat Seidov, installed a delayed-action mine in the Villa Opicina cinema near Trieste. The explosion killed 80 and wounded 260 Germans, of which 40 died later in hospital. At the end of April 1944, Huseynzade, Hans Fritz and Ali Tagiyev blew up a bridge near the Postojna railway station, which led to a 24-car train crash. In May, Huseynzade and Seidov blew up a casino at Trieste, where 150 German officers died and 350 were wounded. Growing concerned about these attacks, Germans set a reward of 400,000 Italian liras for killing Huseynzade.

Death
On 2 November 1944, returning from a successfully executed mission to destroy a German ammunition depot, Mikhailo stumbled upon a German ambush near the town of Vitovlje, Slovenia. After an unequal scramble with German forces, killing 25 of them, Huseynzade ran out of bullets and used the last one to kill himself.

Awards and honors

His life and heroism during World War II was described in Imran Gasimov's book On Distant Shores ("Uzaq sahillərdə"), and the movie made in Soviet years by Azerbaijanfilm movie studio. A football stadium in Sumgayit was named after him. Monuments in his honour have been erected in Baku, as well as in his hometown of Novkhany, Azerbaijan, and near Nova Gorica, Slovenia.

Family

Mehdi Husein-Zade had two sisters — Bikya Khanum and Huriet. Nephew Agshin Alizadeh became well-known Soviet and Azerbaijani composer, People's Artist of Azerbaijan.

References

External links

 Mehti Huseynzade 

1919 births
1944 deaths
People from Absheron District
Azerbaijani military personnel
Azerbaijani military personnel killed in action
Soviet military personnel of World War II from Azerbaijan
Soviet people of World War II
Heroes of the Soviet Union
Guerrillas
Soviet prisoners of war
Soviet military personnel killed in World War II